The Journal of Transport and Land Use is an open access peer-reviewed academic journal covering the interaction of transport and land use that was established in 2008. As of August 2011, it is the official journal of the World Society for Transport and Land Use Research. It is operated on a volunteer basis with institutional support from the Center for Transportation Studies and the Networks, Economics, and Urban Systems Research Group at the University of Minnesota, where it is published three times per year. The editor-in-chief is David M. Levinson.

Abstracting 
The journal is abstracted and indexed in RePEc and the Transportation Research Board TRID database

References

External links 
 

Transportation journals
Open access journals
Business and management journals
Publications established in 2008
Triannual journals
University of Minnesota
Urban studies and planning journals
Land use